Prostanthera stricta, commonly known as Mount Vincent mint bush, is a species of flowering plant in the family Lamiaceae and is endemic to a small area of New South Wales. It is an bushy, erect, spreading shrub with egg-shaped leaves and mauve flowers with darker spots inside.

Description
Flowering occurs from winter to spring.

Taxonomy and naming
Prostanthera stricta was first formally described in 1896 by Richard Thomas Baker in Proceedings of the Linnean Society of New South Wales from specimens collected near Ilford.

Distribution and habitat
This mint bush grows in forest in forest in sandy soil near watercourse on the Central Tablelands and nearby Central West Slopes of New South Wales.

Conservation status
This mintbush is listed as "vulnerable" under the Australian Government Environment Protection and Biodiversity Conservation Act 1999 and the New South Wales Government Biodiversity Conservation Act 2016. The main threats to the species include land clearing, grazing and trampling, and weed invasion.

References

stricta
Flora of New South Wales
Lamiales of Australia
Plants described in 1896
Taxa named by Richard Thomas Baker